Cəfərli is a village and municipality in the Agsu Rayon of Azerbaijan. It has a population of 474.

References

Populated places in Agsu District